The Inter Tribal Council (ITC) is a Brazilian indigenous peoples NGO founded in 1991. They believe that the first step to fighting discrimination is to ensure access to peoples' rights to health, education, opportunity and cultural dialogue as well as their rights to their lands. They participated in the drafting of UN initiatives on indigenous peoples inclusion in the information society.  They also organized the Jogos dos Povos Indígenas, or Indigenous Peoples' Games, in Brazil, the parallel Indigenous Social Forum, and the first World Indigenous Games, to be held in Brazil in 2015. They participated in the Convention on Biological Diversity COP 8 Conference in Curitiba, Brazil, and in 2006 they participated in the I Regional Conference of the Americas against Racism and Racial Discrimination and against All Forms of Discrimination and Intolerance in Brasilia.

References 

Organizations established in 1991
Indigenous politics in Brazil
1991 establishments in Brazil